Aramoun, often referred to as Dawhet Aramoun, is a village in the Aley District of Mount Lebanon, Lebanon, lying to the east of Khalde and 22 kilometres away from Beirut. Aramoun's altitude ranges between 250 meters to 600 meters further east. The village has a Druze and Christian community, while the lower town has a majority Sunni Muslim population.

Nature
The village is primarily known for its olives and olive oil as it enjoys a mountain Mediterranean climate. It is also fairly forested.

Education
Aramoun contains 18 schools, of which two are public serving 699 students, and 16 are private serving 2,372 students.

References

External links
 Aaramoun, Localiban 

Populated places in Aley District
Druze communities in Lebanon